Jönssonligan & den svarta diamanten (English: The Johnson Gang & the Black Diamond) is a Swedish film about the gang Jönssonligan made in 1992. It's the first film not to feature the original gang leader Sickan played by Gösta Ekman. The famous theme of the previous films is also replaced by a new theme to mark the absence of Sickan. The original theme only plays briefly in a single scene.

The film is loosely inspired by the film The Testament of Dr. Mabuse.

Plot 
Ragnar Vanheden and Harry "Dynamit-Harry" Kruth find themselves hooked up with a confused doctor M.A. Busé in a scheme to steal the Romanov family's black diamond.

Cast 
 Peter Haber - Dr. Max Adrian Busé (M.A. Busé)
 Ulf Brunnberg - Ragnar Vanheden
 Björn Gustafson - Dynamit-Harry
 Birgitta Andersson - Doris
 Björn Granath - Nils Loman
 Pontus Gustafsson - Konrad Andersson
 Bernt Lindkvist - Egon Holmberg
 Per Grundén - Wall-Enberg
 Weiron Holmberg - Biffen
 Lena T. Hansson - Mimmi
 Elias Ringqvist - Lillis
 Rikard Wolff - Count Romanoff
 Ulf Eriksson - Patient
 Jan Mybrand - Doctor
 Ulf Friberg - Student
 Suzanne Ernrup - Witness

External links 
 
 
 

Jönssonligan films
1992 films
1990s Swedish films